The 2005 Omaha mayoral election was held on May 10, 2005. It saw the reelection of incumbent mayor Mike Fahey.

Election results

Primary
The primary was held April 13, 2005.

General

References

Omaha
2005 Nebraska elections
2005